Vyking (Harold Carl Everson) is a fictional character, a superhero in the Marvel Universe, member of the Strikeforce: Morituri. The character was created by Peter B. Gillis and Brent Anderson.

Publication history
Vyking (Harold Carl Everson) was created by writer Peter B. Gillis and artist Brent Anderson and debuted in Strikeforce: Morituri #1 (December 1986). The codename "Vyking" was introduced in issue #2. Vyking remained in the regular cast of the book, as the principal character and team leader, up until his sudden death in issue #6.

Fictional character biography
Harold Carl Everson was born in Alexandria, Virginia, the son of Justin and Hilary. Harold was an aspiring young writer, agonizing over how to best use his life and looking for a purpose. Some of his literary works received good reviews in his local network. After the Earth and its Paedia World Government began a savage war against the invading alien race known as the Horde, Everson decided to enlist in the Paedia emergency volunteers, based on an old biomass reactor plant, that was now utilized for junkyard, hospital and defense base. His zealousness also earned him the nickname "Rabid Beaver" from his colleagues.

Still eager to contribute more to his country, Everson tested for the so-called "Morituri program" and was found genetically compatible, one of the precious few among thousands of applicants. The program subjected ordinary humans to a complicated scientific process and conferred them superhuman abilities, to be utilized as a weapon in the war of Earth against the Horde. However, a fatal flaw in the process also ensured the eventual death of its recipients, their organism invariably rejecting the process within a year of receiving, with always lethal results.

Despite his parents' pleas to back off from his decision to enlist to the program, which essentially signified suicide, Everson signed up for it. He had already been fascinated by the cause of the Morituri, after reading a comic book which detailed the adventures of the Black Watch, the first batch of volunteers (now dead) who had undergone the process and had achieved the first major victory of Earth against the Horde. In the Morituri base, Everson watched a video of one of the members of the Black Watch, Woody, and his horrific death due to the Morituri effect. In spite of this, he went on with his decision, partly because of the obligation he felt to defend his planet since he was compatible for the process, and partly because he wanted to write a book, recounting his experiences as a Morituri and immortalizing himself. He was the last member of the first generation of Strikeforce: Morituri to undergo the process.

The Garden
Everson, together with his teammates, were later taken to the Biowar Zone Alpha (nicknamed "the Garden"), a specially designed facility, filled with traps, which would help the Morituri manifest their superhuman powers quickly, under extreme pressure. During the test, several members of the team almost died, in the process of facing the perils of the Garden. Everson pleaded their Commander, Beth Nion, to abort the test. After her refusal, Everson grew paranoid and began believing that Nion had been either bought or replaced by the Horde, and wanted them all to be killed inside the Garden. In his panic, he developed the ability to sense his fellow Morituri (a process he called "imaging"), as well as the ability to reroute any form of energy.

After trying to help his teammates escape their traps, in vain, he sensed the console room into which Commander Nion was giving orders, behind a wall panel of the Garden. Mad with rage, he broke through the wall panel and attacked Nion, battering her. However, the Morituri managed to come out of the test alive and their powers manifested. Everson was embarrassed for his outbreak and apologized to Nion. He then adopted the codename "Vyking", as a tribute to his father's Scandinavian roots.

Leadership
Vyking soon became the unofficial squad leader, thanks to his ability to give orders and form strategic plans. He also started growing closer to his teammate, Snapdragon. He also began recording his book in a recorder. In the team's first official mission, in Kramatorsk, Soviet Union, Vyking was initially paralyzed with fear, plagued by insecurities about his ability to lead. In the end, though, he pulled together and proved his leading skills, and the team triumphed.

Later, the team, by now internationally famous, was invited in a party in New York City, where they met the actors that would portray them in an upcoming soap opera. On their way there, Vyking began experiencing surges of power, a possible sign of the Morituri effect approaching. Terrifed, Vyking managed to suppress it. In the party, Vyking met the actor that depicted him in the series, Greg Mattingly. Vyking again proved his leading skills, when the team battled some Hordians who crushed the party. Shortly afterwards, however, they suffered their first casualty, when Snapdragon died of the Morituri effect.

Death
Sometime later, the team went for some time off in Holowood (21st-century Hollywood). While in a private party, Vyking sensed some Hordians being in the area, an indication that his powers were developing. Vyking left his recorder in the party and led the team to a secret group of Hordians who were stealing famous films from the movie archives of Los Angeles. They soon deduced that the highest earthbound warlord of the Horde had ordered a nuclear strike on L.A. and these Hordians were stealing the movies to later sell them in the black market for profit. Under Vyking's guidance, the team commandeered their ship and decided to move to the Horde fleet in orbit and strike there. En route to the Horde fleet, however, the Morituri effect caught up with Vyking and he exploded in a flash of light. His recorder was later given to new Morituri Commander, Yuri Pogorelich, to be listened to for possible valuable information.

Powers and abilities
Vyking had the ability to redirect/reroute energy attacks, albeit he never perfected this skill. He could also detect other lifeforms and their specific states, a process he called "imaging". Initially, he could sense only those who had undergone the Morituri process. However, later he could also sense the Hordians, possibly because he had been familiarized with them after fighting them repeatedly and/or because of the natural development of his abilities. As a by-product of the Morituri process, like all Morituri, he also possessed enhanced strength and resilience.

References

Comics characters introduced in 1986
Marvel Comics characters with superhuman strength
Marvel Comics male superheroes
Marvel Comics superheroes
Strikeforce: Morituri